Stephen Gillett (born January 20, 1976) is an American businessman, entrepreneur and technology leader. He is currently the President and Chief Executive Officer at Verily, formerly Google Life Sciences. He was chief executive officer of Chronicle Security, an Alphabet company born out of X, the moonshot factory and founded in 2016. Gillett is also an active adviser at Google Ventures and X (formerly GoogleX).

Early life and education

Gillett was born in Los Angeles, California. He is of Lebanese descent, his father being from Tripoli, Lebanon. Gillett moved to Eugene, Oregon, at middle-school age and later attended the University of Oregon. While there, he was a member of the Oregon Ducks football team and participated in the 1996 Cotton Bowl Classic. Gillett graduated with a bachelor's degree before attending San Francisco State University, where he received his master's in business administration.

Career

Corbis
Gillett joined Corbis in 2006 as Chief Information Officer a digital media company owned by Microsoft, where he worked directly under founder Bill Gates. In that role, Stephen was responsible for global technology, engineering and leading platform efforts for Corbis' e-commerce and multimedia licensing business. Gillett opened a Corbis gallery in the three-dimensional virtual world of Second Life, the online game that has grown to more than 9 million residents since its birth in 2003.

Starbucks
Gillett was hired in early 2008 as the Chief Information Officer of Starbucks, shortly after Howard Schultz returned as CEO, becoming one of the youngest CIOs of a Fortune 500 company in history, where he was responsible for leading the technological transformation of Starbucks under Howard Schultz. Gillett was responsible for the global technology efforts for the Starbucks transformation and founded the Starbucks Digital Ventures team in 2009, adding the GM duties to his role as CIO.[4] The Starbucks Technology and Digital efforts introduced many new innovations such as  free wifi, mobile payments and the Starbucks Digital Network. The journey and role Starbucks Information Technology played in the transformation of the company is documented in the book “Onward: How Starbucks Fought for Its Life without Losing Its Soul”.

Best Buy
Gillett joined Best Buy in March 2012 as President and EVP of Digital, Marketing and Business Services in Minneapolis, MN. Gillett was an architect of the 2012 transformation plan called Renew Blue shared at the Q4 2012 Investor meeting. Gillett resigned from his role at Best Buy in December 2012 to relocate back to Silicon Valley.

Symantec
Gillett joined the board of directors for Symantec in 2011, and was a member of the audit committee. In 2012, Gillett also joined Symantec as its chief operating officer. Gillett worked on the divestiture of the Veritas business, which concluded in 2015. Gillett departed the company as result of the COO position being retired after the company split. Symantec said Gillett would remain with the company in a non-executive role during a transitional period in 2015.

Alphabet and Google
In 2015 Gillett joined Google as an executive in residence at Google Ventures (now GV), where he still maintains an active advisory role. Gillett transferred in 2016 to Google X (now X), the moonshot factory. He was CEO of Chronicle, the Alphabet CyberSecurity company, born out of X, the moonshot factory which was acquired into Google Cloud. He is currently the CEO of Verily Life Sciences, the Alphabet healthcare company.

Board of directors
Dutch Bros board of directors (2021–Present), independent director

Discord board of directors (2020–Present), independent director

Symantec board of directors (2011–2012), member audit committee.

Chipotle Mexican Grill board of directors (2015–2017), member audit, nominating governance, committee.

Books 
 From Simi Valley to Silicon Valley (2019)

Community and volunteer service
 Board of trustees, French American School of Puget Sound (2011–2012)
 Seattle's King County board of directors, Boys and Girls Club (2009–2011)
 Boy Scouts of America, den leader (2009–2010)
 University of Oregon, board of directors College of Arts and Science (2015–2017)
 Best Buy Children's Foundation, board of directors  (2012)

Awards and honors
In 2006, Gillett was recognized as an innovative Guild Master in World of Warcraft by Wired.

In 2009, Gillett was named a "40 Under 40 of Seattle & Puget Sound," a regional award program that spotlights the top business leaders under the age of 40.

In 2010, the Aspen Institute named Gillett in the 2010 Henry Crown Fellow Program. with fellowship class members Reid Hoffman and Tim Westergren, which is designed to engage the next generation of business people in the challenge of community-spirited leadership.

In 2010, Fortune (magazine) ranked Gillett #22 in its "40 under 40" list.

In 2011, CNNMoney named Gillett to the Executive Dream Team.

In 2011, Geekwire named Gillett “Geek of the Week.”

In 2012, InformationWeek named Gillett the Technology "Chief Of The Year".

In 2012, Appinions named Gillett as one of the most influential marketing leaders in America.

Personal life
Gillett lives with his family in Silicon Valley. He is an active and longtime player of MMORPGs.

References

Starbucks
Best Buy people
Gen Digital people
Living people
American drink industry businesspeople
Businesspeople in coffee
American people of Lebanese descent
Place of birth missing (living people)
American chief operating officers
Chief information officers
Henry Crown Fellows
1976 births